The Postponed Wedding Night (German:Die vertagte Hochzeitsnacht) is a 1924 German silent comedy film directed by Josef Berger.

Cast
 Claire Kronburger

References

External links

1924 films
Films of the Weimar Republic
Films directed by Josef Berger
German silent feature films
German black-and-white films
German comedy films
1924 comedy films
Silent comedy films
1920s German films
1920s German-language films